Cudillero is one of nine parishes (administrative divisions) in the Cudillero municipality, within the province and autonomous community of Asturias, in northern Spain. 

The population is 1,730 (INE 2007).

References

Parishes in Cudillero